Elliptic Ltd. is a London-based blockchain analysis provider founded in 2013.

Activities
The company's primary business is its blockchain analysis tool that provides cryptocurrency exchanges and financial services with anti-money laundering software. The company also runs a forensics software that law enforcement have used to track bitcoin terrorist funding.

History
When launched in 2013, Elliptic was initially known for providing a cold storage vault service for storing bitcoin private keys to protect them from theft and hacks. Since then the company has been known for its anti-money-laundering analysis software. Software such as Elliptic's has been argued to increase institutionalisation of bitcoin. Elliptic's software has also been used to alert cryptocurrency firms when terrorists attempt to raise money via bitcoin.

On November 4 2020, almost US$1 billion worth of bitcoin that likely originated from Silk Road was on the move, according to Elliptic. Some 69,369 bitcoins were moved out of a wallet that may be associated with the website.

References

British companies established in 2013